Donald Andrew "Donnie" McClurkin, Jr. (born November 9, 1959) is an American gospel singer and minister. He has won three Grammy Awards, ten Stellar Awards, two BET Awards, two Soul Train Awards, one Dove Award and one NAACP Image Awards. He is one of the top selling gospel artists, selling over 10 million albums worldwide. Variety dubbed McClurkin as a "Reigning King of Urban Gospel".

Early life 
McClurkin was born in Copiague, New York in the United States of America. When he was eight years old, his two-year-old brother was hit and killed by a speeding driver. Soon after the loss, McClurkin experienced family turmoil due to the loss of his brother, and shortly thereafter, he was a victim of childhood sexual abuse at the hands of his great uncle, and years after that by his great uncle's son. Two of his sisters dealt with substance abuse problems, and that's when  the young McClurkin found solace in his going to a church; and, also through an aunt of his who sang background vocals with gospel musician, Andraé Crouch. By the time that he was a teenager, he had formed the McClurkin Singers, and later he formed another group, the New York Restoration Choir, with recordings from as early as 1975.

Ministry 

He was hired, as an associate minister, at Marvin Winans' Perfecting Church in Detroit, Michigan, in 1989.  McClurkin served as an assistant to Winans for over a decade.

In 1991, a sharp pain and swelling, followed by internal bleeding led, he says, to his being diagnosed as having leukemia. The doctor suggested immediate treatment, but McClurkin, who was then 31, decided to take his own advice. "I tell people to believe that God will save you," he says, "[and] I had to turn around and practice the very thing that I preached."

He was ordained and sent out by the Winans in 2001 to establish Perfecting Faith Church in Freeport, New York, where he is now Senior Pastor.

Music 

A friendship with a Warner Alliance executive resulted in his signing to the label for his 1996 self-titled LP, with producers Bill Maxwell, Mark Kibble of Take 6, Cedric and Victor Caldwell plus Andraé Crouch. The disc, which featured the perennially popular "Stand," went gold shortly after being publicly lauded by Oprah Winfrey. At the 48th Annual Grammy Awards, he won in the category Traditional Soul Gospel Album, for "Psalms, Hymns & Spiritual Songs". McClurkin is best known for his hit songs "Stand" and "We Fall Down" which were played in heavy rotation on both Gospel and Urban radio. His three solo albums have topped the Billboard charts.

Dovetailing off the success of his near double-platinum selling album,"Live in London and More" McClurkin released "Psalms,Hymns and Spiritual Songs" in 2005 and "We All Are One: Live In Detroit" in 2009 which also topped Billboard charts across various musical genres. McClurkin's love for people and desire to share gospel music, globally, is the reason he includes a language medley: Japanese, Russian, Spanish, and Dutch in most live performances.

Radio and television 

Tom Versen and Tony Sisti of T&T Creative signed McClurkin to a radio syndication deal with advertising giant Dial-Global and syndicator Gary Bernstein. T&T Creative provided a mobile recording studio in Pastor Donnie's church that he can also take on the road. He is quoted as saying, "As much as I love music and singing, I really love doing radio and the direct feedback I get from my listeners all over the country. I never thought I would be having this much fun doing radio and I could touch and impact so many beautiful people."[19]

In 2009, he also broadcast his own television series, Perfecting Your Faith, on cable television. His television appearances include Good Morning America, CBS’s The Early Show, The View, Girlfriends and The Parkers. He has also been featured in such films as The Gospel and The Fighting Temptations. He played a Single Man or a Church Pastor.

Personal life 
McClurkin, in 2002, told a Christian website that, due to sexual abuse and porn, he had struggled with homosexuality. "McClurkin believes he "turned" gay because of childhood molestation and traumatic exposure to pornography, but was able to reverse his orientation through will and prayer." He also said that he had rejected that "lifestyle": "I’ve been through this and have experienced God’s power to change my lifestyle. I am delivered and I know God can deliver others, too."

McClurkin's listing as a headlining performer for then-Senator Barack Obama's 2008 Presidential campaign stirred controversy because of his views on homosexuality. As a result, McClurkin was removed from the performance roster but he still performed at one of the concerts. In August 2013, McClurkin was disinvited from the 50th anniversary of the March on Washington for Jobs and Freedom as his ex-gay status was seen as disruptive. In 2015 he spoke out against same-sex marriage in response to the U.S. Supreme Court making it legal nationwide.

In 2016, it was reported that McClurkin had entered a relationship with CCM singer-songwriter Nicole C. Mullen. In 2021, McClurkin in an interview on TV One's Unsung, spoke about his relationship with Mullen, explaining that he had never had a long-term relationship and he believes that this, as well as his previous relationships with men and women had made him oblivious about what women want in a relationship. He also remarked that he is concerned that he may never marry.

McClurkin has a son, Matthew, born in 2000. McClurkin is also related to singer Marsha McClurkin of the short-lived new jack swing group Abstrac.

In 2018, McClurkin survived a serious road accident after he lost consciousness while driving.

Discography

Studio albums

Live albums

Compilations

Singles

Videography 
Live in London and More... (VHS) (2001)
Again (VHS) (2004)
Psalms, Hymns & Spiritual Songs (VHS) (2005)

Music Videos
"Stand"
"We Fall Down"
"The Prayer" 
"Ooh Child" 
"I Need You"

Filmography 
Film
1998: The Prince of Egypt (wrote and sang "I Am" & "Humanity")
2003: The Fighting Temptations
2004: Apollo at 70: A Hot Night in Harlem
2004: The Donnie McClurkin Story: From Darkness to Light
2005: The Gospel

Television
2002: 17th Annual Stellar Gospel Music Awards – co-host
2004: 19th Annual Stellar Gospel Music Awards – co-host
2005: 20th Annual Stellar Gospel Music Awards – co-host
2006: 21st Annual Stellar Gospel Music Awards – co-host
2006: An Evening of Stars: Tribute to Stevie Wonder (documentary)
2009: 24th Annual Stellar Gospel Music Awards – co-host
2010–15: BET's Sunday Best – judge
2010: 25th Annual Stellar Gospel Music Awards – host

Accolades 
Over his storied career, McClurkin has won a number of awards, including three Grammy Awards, two BET Awards and two Soul Train Music Awards.

References

External links 
 
 The Donnie McClurkin Show: radio broadcast
 Exclusive Interview on BlackGospel.com (October 2008): Interview
 Música de Donnie McClurkin

20th-century American singers
21st-century American singers
1959 births
American gospel singers
American Pentecostals
Church of God in Christ pastors
Grammy Award winners
Living people
Members of the Church of God in Christ
People from Copiague, New York
People self-identified as ex-gay
Singers from New York (state)
Urban contemporary gospel musicians